FC Borislav is a Bulgarian football club based in Parvomay, Plovdiv Province, which competes in the South-East Third League, the third division of Bulgarian football.

Current squad 
As of 1 February 2020

References

External links 
 Official website
 Club page at facebook

Borislav
Borislav
Borislav